The following is a list of events from the year 1929 in Taiwan, Empire of Japan.

Incumbents

Central government of Japan
 Prime Minister: Tanaka Giichi, Hamaguchi Osachi

Taiwan
 Governor-General – Kawamura Takeji, Ishizuka Eizō

Events

March
 27 March - The opening of Gueiren Agriculture School in Tainan Prefecture.

October
 1 October – The opening of Fugang railway station in Shinchiku Prefecture.

Births
 15 March – Clement Chang, politician (d. 2018)
 24 May – Kao Ching-yuen, businessperson
 6 June – Kao Chun-ming, presbyterian

References

 
Years of the 20th century in Taiwan